Shahpur tehsil is a fourth-order administrative and revenue division, a subdivision of third-order administrative and revenue division of Betul district of Madhya Pradesh.

Geography
Shahpur tehsil has an area of 594.37 sq kilometers. It is bounded by Chicholi tehsil in the southwest, west and northwest, Hoshangabad district in the north and northeast and Ghodadongari tehsil in the east, southeast and south.

See also 
Betul district

Citations

External links

Tehsils of Madhya Pradesh
Betul district